The OnePlus Nord 2 5G is an Android-based smartphone manufactured by OnePlus, unveiled on 22 July 2021. It succeeds the original Nord, and is the sixth device in the Nord series.

Specifications

Design 
Like its predecessor, the Nord 2 5G has a plastic frame with a metallic finish and Gorilla Glass 5 protecting the screen and back panel. The power button and mute switch are located on the right side, while the volume key is located on the left side. The top has a secondary microphone, and the bottom has the primary microphone, USB-C port, loudspeaker, and dual-SIM card slot. The rear camera array is in the top corner, housing three sensors, and the dual-LED flash. 

The device is available in Gray Sierra and Blue Haze, as well as Green-Wood which has artificial leather.

Hardware

Chipset 
The OnePlus Nord 2 5G is powered by the MediaTek Dimensity 1200 processor with the Mali-G77 MC9 GPU. It has 128 or 256 GB of non-expandable UFS 3.1, and 8 or 12 GB of RAM.

Display 
The Nord 2 5G has a 6.43-inch 1080p (2400 × 1080) AMOLED with a 90Hz refresh rate. There is a circular cutout at the top left corner for the front-facing camera, and an optical fingerprint scanner below the display. The display supports HDR and HDR10+, and has AI resolution boost and AI Color Boost video enhancement features.

Camera 
The device has a triple camera setup on the rear, with a 50 MP Sony IMX766 wide sensor with PDAF and OIS, an 8 MP ultrawide sensor, and a 2 MP monochrome sensor. It can record video at a maximum of 4K at 30 fps, and also offers 1080p at 30, 60 or 240 fps. The front camera has a single 32 MP Sony IMX616 sensor, omitting the Nord's ultrawide lens.

Battery 
The Nord 2 5G has a non-removable 4,500 mAh battery. It features Warp Charge 65, which is advertised as being capable of fully recharging the battery in 30 minutes, however it lacks support for wireless charging.

Software 
The Nord 2 5G runs on OxygenOS 11.3, based on Android 11, and is upgradable to Android 12. OnePlus offers two years of Android updates and three years of security updates.

References

External links 
 

OnePlus mobile phones
Android (operating system) devices
Mobile phones introduced in 2021
Mobile phones with multiple rear cameras
Mobile phones with 4K video recording